Little Baby Buntin'  is the third album by Killdozer, released in 1987 through Touch and Go Records. This album, as well as the earlier E.P. Burl, have a much darker sense of humor (focusing primarily on the bleak aspects of society and people) than any of their other albums.

Track topics include a crazy man who throws his mother down a flight of stairs, a man with a "bubblegum face" who "with a sack on his head is still a sexual beast", a man who ends up blowing himself away in his driveway while trying to murder his wife, etc.

According to an interview with Michael Gerald, The song "The Puppy" is based on real-life events.  The song is about a biker gang in Madison called "Satan's Dragons", none of whom actually owned a bike, who ended up murdering one of their initiates, or "puppies".  The man ended up making some rude comments about the gang leader's wife and was found naked and mutilated in a field with his penis shoved in his mouth.  Michael Gerald is quoted as saying "I naturally imagined them being the type who would set a dog's balls on fire".

This CD also includes a cover of Neil Diamond's song "I Am, I Said".

Track listing

Personnel 
Killdozer
Michael Gerald – vocals, bass guitar, percussion
Bill Hobson – electric guitar, acoustic guitar, cello, percussion
Dan Hobson – drums, tambourine, timpani, percussion
Production and additional personnel
Steve Marker – production, engineering, recording
Butch Vig – production, recording

References

External links 
 

1987 albums
Albums produced by Butch Vig
Killdozer (band) albums
Touch and Go Records albums